Back That Fact is an American game show that aired on ABC from October 22 to November 26, 1953.  This was the first TV game show for creator/producers Jack Barry and Dan Enright. Borscht Belt comedian and syndicated columnist Joey Adams was the emcee, with actress Hope Lange and actor Al Kelly as his assistants and Carl Caruso as the announcer.

Back That Fact was broadcast from New York City.

Game play 
At the beginning of the show, a panel of judges was chosen from members of the studio audience.  Then the emcee would interview another member of the audience about that person's life, family, job, hobbies and other parts of their background.  If at any time during the interview the contestant made a positive assertion on an answer, the announcer would interrupt and ask the player to "Back That Fact".  At that point, the player would attempt to prove, to the best of their ability, that the assertion was true.  The judges would then decide if the player successfully justified or verified their explanation.  If the judges agreed, the player won a modest prize. If not, the player lost the game and another player is interviewed.

Two or three audience members were chosen to be interviewed during the course of the show.

Episode status 
Back That Fact is believed not to have been recorded on kinescope. No episodes are known to exist.

References

External links 
 

1950s American game shows
1953 American television series debuts
1953 American television series endings
American Broadcasting Company original programming
Black-and-white American television shows
Television series by Barry & Enright Productions
Lost television shows